Ōkami Kakushi is a 12-episode 2010 Japanese anime television series based on the Konami visual novel of the same name. The series is produced by AIC under the direction of Nobuhiro Takamoto. The series was first broadcast on the TBS television network in Japan between January 8 and March 26, 2010. Two pieces of theme music are currently used during the series for the opening and closing. The opening theme is  performed by FictionJunction.

Episode list

References

Okami Kakushi